RaHoWa or RAHOWA could refer to:

 Racial holy war, the neo-Nazi concept of a race war
 RaHoWa (band), a Canadian white supremacist punk rock band